William Henry Fox  (January 15, 1872 – May 7, 1946) was a Major League Baseball second baseman. He played for the Washington Senators in 1897 and the Cincinnati Reds in 1901. He also played at College of the Holy Cross. He played in the minor leagues from 1894 through 1913 and managed in 1908–1910, 1912–1913 and 1915.

External links

1872 births
1946 deaths
Baseball players from Massachusetts
Washington Senators (1891–1899) players
Cincinnati Reds players
Major League Baseball second basemen
Minor league baseball managers
Hartford Bluebirds players
Waterbury Brassmen players
Waterbury Indians players
Toronto Canucks players
Rome Romans players
Indianapolis Hoosiers (minor league) players
Indianapolis Indians players
Minneapolis Millers (baseball) players
Lincoln Treeplanters players
Lincoln Railsplitters players
Omaha Rourkes players
St. Joseph Drummers players
Mobile Sea Gulls players
Racine Belles (1909–1915) players
19th-century baseball players
People from Sturbridge, Massachusetts
Sportspeople from Worcester County, Massachusetts